The 1923 Drake Bulldogs football team was an American football team that represented Drake University as a member of the Missouri Valley Conference (MVC) during the 1923 college football season. In its third season under head coach Ossie Solem, the team compiled a 5–2 record (3–1 against MVC opponents), placed third in the MVC, and outscored its opponents by a total of 168 to 49.

Halfback Bill Boelter was the team captain. Other key players included quarterback Sam Orebaugh.

Schedule

References

Drake
Drake Bulldogs football seasons
Drake Bulldogs football